Statistics of American Soccer League II in season 1951–52.

League standings

New England Division

References

American Soccer League (1933–1983) seasons
American Soccer League, 1951-52